Murrurundi railway station is a heritage-listed railway station located on the Main Northern line in Murrurundi in the Upper Hunter Shire local government area of New South Wales, Australia. It was built between 1872 and 1917. It is also known as Murrurundi Railway Station group. The station serves the town of Murrurundi and opened on 4 April 1872. The station served as the terminus of the line until it was extended to Quirindi on 13 August 1877. The station was added to the New South Wales State Heritage Register on 2 April 1999.

Services
Murrurundi is served by NSW TrainLink's daily Northern Tablelands Xplorer service operating between Armidale/Moree and Sydney. This station is a request stop, so the train only stops here if passengers have booked to board/alight here.

History 
From 1891 until August 1965, Murrurundi had a four road locomotive depot to the north of the station, primarily as a base for bank engines used on the steeply graded banks over the Liverpool Range to Ardglen Tunnel north of the town. A yard existed opposite the station.

Description 
The station has one platform and a passing loop. The complex comprises a type 3, second class, brick station with hip-roof, erected in 1872; a type 18, brick gable building, non-standard, erected ; a type 18, infill between buildings, erected possibly in 1891; an open timber framed signal box with a non-standard roof, erected in 1917; and a timber store building with a skillion roof. Other structures include brick platform faces.

Heritage listing 
Murrurundi was an important locomotive depot with a substantial straight shed and locomotive facility at the west end of the yard, all of which has been removed. The remaining structures comprising the station buildings, footbridge, residences and goods shed are a good representative group and are individually good examples of their kind. The station is particularly interesting because of the two buildings constructed within a year of each other in different styles. The main building being a fine second class building and the other a more modest gable roof building. The section linking them and adding the awning is also of significance. The residences are all excellent examples of residences for various positions at the complex from station master to loco foreman and the range from brick to timber is representative of many similar structures. The site is visually important in Murrurundi and with the nearby Temple Court station form an important and significant group of structures.

Murrurundi railway station was listed on the New South Wales State Heritage Register on 2 April 1999 having satisfied the following criteria.

The place possesses uncommon, rare or endangered aspects of the cultural or natural history of New South Wales.

This item is assessed as historically rare. This item is assessed as scientifically rare. This item is assessed as archeologically rare. This item is assessed as socially rare.

See also

References

Bibliography

Attribution

External links

Murrurundi station details Transport for New South Wales

Easy Access railway stations in New South Wales
Railway stations in the Hunter Region
Railway stations in Australia opened in 1872
Regional railway stations in New South Wales
New South Wales State Heritage Register
Murrurundi
Articles incorporating text from the New South Wales State Heritage Register
Main North railway line, New South Wales